This is a list of amphibians and reptiles found in Denmark. It does not include species found only in captivity or extinct species. Conservation status after most recent Danish Red List, with assessment criteria following IUCN.

Summary of 2006 IUCN Red List categories.
Conservation status - IUCN Red List of Threatened Species:
 - Extinct,  - extinct in the wild
 - Critically endangered,  - Endangered,  - Vulnerable
 - Near threatened,  - Least concern
 - Data deficient,  - Not evaluated

Amphibians

Salamanders 
Family: Salamandridae (true salamanders and newts)
Great crested newt (Triturus cristatus) 
Alpine newt (Ichthyosaura alpestris) 
Smooth newt (Lissotriton vulgaris)

Frogs and toads 
Family: Bombinatoridae (fire-bellied toads)
European fire-bellied toad (Bombina bombina) 
Family: Pelobatidae (European spadefoot toads)
Common spadefoot (Pelobates fuscus) 
Family: Bufonidae (true toads)
Common toad (Bufo bufo) 
Natterjack toad (Bufo calamita) 
European green toad (Pseudepidalea (Bufo) viridis) 
Family: Hylidae (tree frogs and their allies)
Common tree frog (Hyla arborea) 
Family: Ranidae (true frogs)
Typical frogs
Common frog (Rana temporaria) 
Moor frog (Rana arvalis) 
Agile frog (Rana dalmatina) 
Water frogs
Marsh frog (Pelophylax ridibundus) 
Edible frog (Pelophylax kl. esculentus)

Reptiles 
Family: Lacertidae (wall or true lizards)
Viviparous lizard (Zootoca vivipara) 
Sand lizard (Lacerta agilis) 

Family:  Anguidae
Slowworm (Anguis fragilis) 

Family: Viperidae (vipers)
European adder (Vipera berus) 
Family: Colubridae (colubrid snakes)
Grass snake (Natrix natrix) 
Smooth snake (Coronella austriaca) , last confirmed finding from 1914
Aesculapian snake (Zamenis longissimus) , last confirmed finding from 1863

Family: Emydidae (pond turtles)
European pond turtle (Emys orbicularis)  Almost certainly animals released from captivity or their descendants
Red-eared slider (Trachemys scripta)  Invasive species

References 

Amphibians and reptiles
Denmark
Denmark
Denmark
Denmark
amphibians and reptiles